101 Vehicles is a 1988 role-playing game supplement for MegaTraveller published by Digest Group Publications.

Contents
101 Vehicles is a MegaTraveller supplement describing 101 vehicles designed according to the vehicle rules, each with an illustration.  The types described are Military (including tanks, hover-buggies, APCs, and attack speeders), Para-Military (including ATVs, hydrofoils, and air/rafts), and Civilian (including explorer vehicles, ground cars, cycles, trucks, and yachts).

Publication history
101 Vehicles was written by Rob Caswell, William W. Connors, Joe Fugate, Leidner, Nancy Parker, Robert Parker, and Tom Peters, with a cover by Tim Peters, and was published by Digest Group Publications in 1988 as a 48-page book.

Reception
In the January 1989 edition of Dragon (Issue #141), Jim Bambra called the supplement "a handy source of instant vehicles and a good example of the versatility of the design sequence. It is a useful addition to the MegaTraveller game."

References

Role-playing game supplements introduced in 1988
Traveller (role-playing game) supplements